Sri Lanka national football team fixtures and results 1980–2009 are as follows:

1984

1986

1989

1991

1993

1995

1996

1997

1998

1999

2000

2001

2002

2003

2004

2005

2006

2007

2008

2009 

1980s
1980s in Sri Lankan sport
1990s in Sri Lankan sport
2000s in Sri Lankan sport